Alcimus was a Greek rhetorician who flourished around 300 BC.  He was called by Diogenes Laërtius the most distinguished of all Greek rhetoricians.  It is not certain whether he is the same as the Alcimus to whom Diogenes in another passage ascribes a work called Pros Amuntan.  Athenaeus in several places speaks of a Sicilian Alcimus, who appears to have been the author of a great historical work, parts of which are referred to under the names of Italica and Sicelica.  But whether he was the same as the rhetorician Alcimus, cannot be determined.

Notes

References

3rd-century BC Greek people
Ancient Greek writers known only from secondary sources
Ancient Greek rhetoricians